Una questione privata is a 1993 Italian film directed by Alberto Negrin with a screenplay based on the WWII partisan novel of the same name by Beppe Fenoglio (1963) adapted by Raffaele La Capria. The film stars the young British actor Rupert Graves as Milton, Céline Beauvallet, and Claudio Mazzenga.

Cast
 Rupert Graves as Milton
 Rupert Graves as Milton
 Céline Beauvallet as Fulvia
 Claudio Mazzenga as Giorgio
 Fabio Sartor as Tenente
 Pina Cei as La Custode
 Gabriele Benedetti as Riccio
Rodolfo Corsato as Ferdi
Franco Fantasia as Colonnello della divisione 'San Marco'
Pierfrancesco Favino as Ivan
Domenico Fortunato as Rozzoni
Massimo Lodolo as Leo
Susanna Marcomeni as La Maestra
Alessandro Stefanelli as Hombre
Luca Zingaretti as Sceriffo

References

External links 

1993 films
Italian war drama films
1990s Italian films